John Essington (c. 1667–1740), of Gossington Hall, Slimbridge, Gloucestershire, was an English politician.

He was born the second son of John Essington of Gossington Hall and was trained in the law at Lincoln's Inn in 1691. He inherited Gossington Hall, which had been built by his grandfather, after the death of his elder brother in 1703.

He was a Member (MP) of the Parliament of Great Britain for Aylesbury from 1710 to 1715.

He married twice, firstly in 1697 Margaret, the daughter and coheiress of John Godfrey and secondly in 1702, Mary. He had one daughter, to whom he left his various properties.

References

1667 births
1740 deaths
18th-century English people
People from Stroud District
Members of Lincoln's Inn
Members of the Parliament of Great Britain for English constituencies
British MPs 1710–1713
British MPs 1713–1715